Pseudhesperosuchus (meaning "false Hesperosuchus") is a genus of sphenosuchian, a type of basal crocodylomorph, the clade that comprises the crocodilians and their closest kin. It is known from a partial skeleton and skull found in rocks of the Late Triassic (Norian-age) Los Colorados Formation of the Ischigualasto-Villa Unión Basin in northwestern Argentina.

History and description 
Pseudhesperosuchus is based on PVL 3830.  This specimen consists of a skull and lower jaws, most of the vertebral column, the shoulder girdle, and parts of the arms and legs.  The genus was named by José Bonaparte in 1969.  The type species is P. jachaleri. The skull, though nearly complete, is poorly preserved, and some of its bones and sutures have been misidentified over the years. A 2002 phylogenetic analysis of sphenosuchians performed by James Clark and Hans–Dieter Sues found Pseudhesperosuchus to have an unresolved position along with several other sphenosuchians, neither closer to true crocodiles or to Sphenosuchus. The genus is sometimes misspelled Pseudohesperosuchus, as in Carroll (1988).

References 

Triassic crocodylomorpha
Terrestrial crocodylomorphs
Norian life
Late Triassic reptiles of South America
Triassic Argentina
Fossils of Argentina
Los Colorados Formation
Fossil taxa described in 1969
Taxa named by José Bonaparte
Prehistoric pseudosuchian genera